II is the debut album of High Rise, released in 1986 through P.S.F. Records. A remastered version by Asahito Nanjo was released on February 9, 2018 through Black Editions.

Track listing

Personnel 
High Rise
Asahito Nanjo – vocals, bass guitar
Munehiro Narita – guitar
Yuro Ujiie – drums
Production and additional personnel
Kazu Hama – mixing, recording
Kenji Nakazawa – recording

References

External links 
 

1986 debut albums
High Rise (band) albums
P.S.F. Records albums